Phenyl azide is an organic compound with the formula C6H5N3.  It is one of the prototypical organic azides.  It is a pale yellow oily liquid with a pungent odor. The structure consists of a linear azide substituent bound to a phenyl group.  The C−N=N angle is approximately 120°.

Preparation
Phenyl azide is prepared by the diazotization of phenylhydrazine with nitrous acid:
C6H5NHNH2  +  HNO2  → C6H5N3  +  2 H2O

Aryl iodides bearing electron-withdrawing substituents undergo metathesis with sodium azide in the presence of Cu(I), sodium ascorbate, and N,N'-dimethylethane-1,2-diamine (DMEDA):

RC6H4I  +  NaN3   →   RC6H4N3  +  NaI

It can also be prepared by condensation of benzenediazonium salt with toluenesulfonamide, followed by hydrolysis.

Chemical reactions
Phenyl azide cycloadds to alkenes and especially alkynes, particularly those bearing electronegative substituents. In a classic example of click chemistry, phenyl azide and phenylacetylene react to give diphenyl triazole.

Phenyl azide reacts with triphenylphosphine to give the Staudinger reagent triphenylphosphine phenylimide (C6H5NP(C6H5)3).

Thermolysis induces loss of N2 to give the highly reactive phenylnitrene C6H5N.

Safety
As with many other azides, phenyl azide poses a risk of explosion, so a protective blast shield is recommended during purification and handling.  Distillations are hazardous.  Organic Syntheses recommends a vacuum of 5mm Hg to give a boiling point of "66–68 °C/21 mm. with a bath temperature of 70–75 °C."  The pure substance may be stored in the dark, cold, and even then the shelf-life is only weeks.

References

Phenyl compounds
IARC Group 3 carcinogens
Organoazides